Cradley Heath railway station serves the town of Cradley Heath in the West Midlands of England. It is on the Birmingham to Worcester via Kidderminster Line. The station is managed by West Midlands Railway, who provide the majority of train services; there are also occasional services provided by Chiltern Railways.

Cradley Heath bus station is right in front of the railway station; together they form Cradley Heath Interchange.

History
The station was opened in 1863 by the Stourbridge Railway, on their line from Stourbridge Junction to Old Hill. This was later taken over by the Great Western Railway, who incorporated it into their line to Birmingham. Historically, the station was known as Cradley, and later as Cradley Heath and Cradley.

The present station buildings date from the mid-1980s when the station was rebuilt entirely on the west side of the level crossing. Previously there had been a staggered platform arrangement on either side of the crossing.

Incidents 

Following an incident on 7 October 1954, lamp-man Anthony Rivers was awarded the George Medal and the Order of Industrial Heroism. Rivers had gone to assist a woman whose foot was caught in a level crossing between the station's platforms. As a train bore down on them, he realised he could not free her, so held her away from the tracks and the train severed her foot. In doing so, he suffered a fractured pelvis and a broken forearm.

Services
During Monday to Saturday daytimes, there are six trains per hour in each direction, operated by West Midlands Railway, between Birmingham Snow Hill and Stourbridge Junction. Many of these continue beyond Stourbridge to Kidderminster, Worcester Foregate Street or Great Malvern, and beyond Birmingham to Whitlocks End, Stratford-upon-Avon, Dorridge or Leamington Spa. During evenings and on Sundays, there are typically two trains per hour.

There are also occasional trains during peak periods to and from London Marylebone, provided by Chiltern Railways. Regular direct services to and from Birmingham New Street (the terminus for all eastbound trains between 1967 and the reopening of the line to Snow Hill in 1995) ceased in May 2004 and passengers wishing to travel there must now change at Galton Bridge.

Bus interchange
Alongside the railway station there is a bus station with five bus stands, which opened during the 1980s. The bus station was extensively rebuilt from 2014 to 2015, and reopened in July 2015 as Cradley Heath Interchange. The bus station is owned and operated by Transport for West Midlands which charges operators for their usage. Services are operated by National Express West Midlands and Diamond Bus.  The former Midland Red bus depot stands across the road from the interchange and is now Hawks Cycles.

References

Further reading

External links

 Photographs of the bus station

Bus stations in the West Midlands (county)
DfT Category E stations
Former Great Western Railway stations
Railway stations in Great Britain opened in 1863
Railway stations in Sandwell
Railway stations served by Chiltern Railways
Railway stations served by West Midlands Trains
Smethwick